Madonna (retitled Madonna: The First Album for the 1985 reissue) is the debut studio album by American singer-songwriter Madonna, released on July 27, 1983, by Sire Records. After having established herself as a singer in downtown New York City, Madonna was signed by Sire president Seymour Stein, due to the club success of her debut single, "Everybody" (1982). She became the sole writer for most of the album's tracks, and chose Reggie Lucas as its primary producer. Unhappy with Lucas's production outputs, she invited John "Jellybean" Benitez to complete the album; he remixed three tracks and produced "Holiday".

Madonna has an upbeat synthetic disco sound, using new technology of the time, including the Linn drum machine, Moog bass and Oberheim OB-X synthesizer. She sang in a bright, girlish timbre, with lyrics about love and relationships. To promote the album, Madonna performed one-off gigs in clubs and on television in the United States and United Kingdom throughout 1983 and 1984, followed by The Virgin Tour in 1985. Five singles were released, including the international top-ten hits "Holiday", "Lucky Star", and "Borderline". Their accompanying music videos were released on the Madonna video compilation, which became the best-selling videocassette of 1985 in the United States.

Madonna peaked at number eight on the Billboard 200, and was certified five-times platinum by the Recording Industry Association of America (RIAA) for shipment of five million copies across the United States. It reached the top ten of the charts in Australia, France, Netherlands, New Zealand, and the United Kingdom, and sold more than 10 million copies worldwide. The album received generally favorable reviews from music critics and was included in "The 100 Best Debut Albums of All Time" by Rolling Stone in 2013 and 2022 saying that "it succeed in introducing the most important female voice in the history of modern music". The album has been credited for setting the standard of dance-pop for decades afterward, and for pointing the direction for numerous female artists of the 1980s.

Background 
In 1979, Madonna was living in New York City and establishing her music career as a member of rock band the Breakfast Club with her boyfriend Dan Gilroy. In late 1980, she was joined by Stephen Bray, her boyfriend from Michigan, who became the drummer of the band. Shortly after, Madonna and Bray left the Breakfast Club and formed the band Emmy and the Emmys. The two began writing songs together and they recorded a four-song demo tape in November 1980, but soon after, Madonna decided to promote herself as a solo artist. In 1981, Madonna got signed by a music management company called Gotham Records. During that time, Madonna wrote and developed some songs on her own. She carried rough tapes of three of the songs, "Everybody", "Ain't No Big Deal" and "Burning Up". She frequented nightclubs such as Danceteria where she convinced DJ Mark Kamins to play "Everybody". The song was received positively by the crowd, and Kamins decided that he should get Madonna a record deal. Kamins, who also worked as an A&R man for Island Records, played her demo tape for the label's founder Chris Blackwell, but Blackwell refused to sign her so Kamins sent the tape to Sire Records. The President of Sire, Seymour Stein was impressed by her demo and met Madonna while he was admitted to Lenox Hill Hospital. She was ultimately signed for a deal for a total of three singles with an option for an album. Michael Rosenblatt, who worked in the A&R department of Sire, offered Madonna $15,000 in advance per single, plus a publishing deal for an advance of $2,500 for each song she wrote.

Development 

The 12" single for "Everybody" was produced by Mark Kamins at Blank Tapes Studios in New York, who took over the production work from Stephen Bray. The new recording ran 5:56 on one side and 9:23 for the dub version on the reverse side. Madonna and Kamins had to record the single at their own cost. Arthur Baker, a friend of Kamins, guided him through the role of a music producer and provided him with studio musician Fred Zarr who played keyboards on the track. Zarr became one of the common musical threads on the album by eventually performing on every track. Due to restrained budget the recording was done hurriedly. Madonna and Kamins had difficulty in understanding each other's inputs for the sessions. Rosenblatt wanted to release "Everybody" with "Ain't No Big Deal" on the other side, but later changed his mind and put "Everybody" on both sides of the vinyl record after hearing the recorded version of "Ain't No Big Deal". The single was commercially released in October 1982 and became a dance hit in the United States. Shortly after its release, Sire Records gave the green light to record an album.

The album was primarily recorded at Sigma Sound Studios in New York City. Madonna opted not to work with either Kamins or Bray, but chose Reggie Lucas, a Warner Bros. producer. Bray decided to push her in the musical direction of pop, and recorded the song "Burning Up" with her. However, Madonna still did not have enough material to generate a full album. The songs available were, "Lucky Star", a new version of "Ain't No Big Deal", "Think of Me" and "I Know It". She met with Lucas at the apartment of her boyfriend Jean-Michel Basquiat, and he brought another two songs to the project, "Physical Attraction" and "Borderline". As he recorded the tracks he deviated considerably from the original versions of the demos. One such altered song was "Lucky Star". The song was written by Madonna for Kamins, who previously promised to play the track at Danceteria. However, the track was instead used by Madonna for the album, which she planned to call Lucky Star. She believed that "Lucky Star", along with "Borderline", were the perfect foundation for her album.

Problems arose between her and Lucas during the recording of the songs. Madonna was unhappy with the way the final versions turned out. According to Madonna, Lucas used too many instruments and did not consider her ideas for the songs. This led to a dispute between the two and, after finishing the album, Lucas left the project without tailoring the songs to Madonna's specifications; hence she called John "Jellybean" Benitez, a DJ at Funhouse disco, to remix the available tracks. In the meantime, due to a conflict of interest, Bray had sold "Ain't No Big Deal" to an act on another label, rendering it unavailable for Madonna's project. It was Benitez who discovered a new song, written by Curtis Hudson and Lisa Stevens of the pop group Pure Energy. The song, titled "Holiday", had been turned down by Phyllis Hyman and Mary Wilson, formerly of the Supremes. Benitez and Madonna sent the demo to their friend, Fred Zarr so he could embellish the arrangement and program the synthesizer lines. After vocals were recorded by Madonna, Benitez spent four days trying to enhance the commercial appeal of the track before the April 1983 deadline. Just before it was completed, Madonna and Benitez met Fred Zarr at Sigma Sound in Manhattan, where Zarr added the now familiar piano solo towards the end of the track.

Music and lyrics 
According to AllMusic, Madonna is a dance-pop and post-disco album, while Sal Cinquemani of Slant Magazine stated that the album's sound is "post-disco, post-punk dance." The overall sound of the album is dissonant, and is in the form of upbeat synthetic disco, using some of the new technology of the time, like the usage of Linn drum machine, Moog bass and the OB-X synthesizer. This equipment has dated since, consequently the sound of the album comes off as somewhat harsh. Madonna commented on her debut album: "The songs were pretty weak and I went to England during the recordings so I wasn't around... I wasn't in control. [...] I didn't realize how crucial it was for me to break out of the disco mold before I'd already finished the [first] album. I wish I could have got a little more variety there." The album starts with the song "Lucky Star", a medium-paced dance track, beginning with a sparkle of synth note and is followed by heavy beats of electronic drum and handclaps. A guitar is played in high riff and a bubbling bass synth is produced to accompany the guitar sound. The song revolves around the "Starlight, starbright" hook for more than a minute, before going to the chorus. According to author Rikky Rooksby, the lyrics are repetitive and inane, revolving around the transparent ambiguity of the stars, and juxtaposition of the male character with being a heavenly body in the sky.

"Borderline" is a sentimental track, talking about a love that is never quite fulfilled. According to author Santiago Fouz-Hernández and his book Madonna's drowned worlds, the lyrics of the song like "Something in the way you love me won't let me be/I don't want to be your prisoner so baby won't you set me free" depicted a rebellion against male chauvinism. Madonna used a refined and expressive voice to sing the song, backed by Lucas's instrumentation. It opens with a keyboard rich intro and a catchy synth melody provided by Fred Zarr. Bass player Anthony Jackson doubled Dean Gant's synth bass to provide a solid and more complex texture. The chords in the song were inspired by Seventies disco sound in Philadelphia as well as Elton John's musical style during the mid-seventies. The chord sequences cite from Bachman–Turner Overdrive's song "You Ain't Seen Nothing Yet" while the synth phases display her typical musical style. The third track "Burning Up" has a starker arrangement, brought about by bass, single guitar and Linn drum machine. The drum beats used in the song were reminiscent to the records of singer Phil Collins. It also incorporated electric guitars and the most state-of-the-art synthesizers of that time. The chorus is a repetition of the same three lines, while the bridge consists of a series of double entendres; the lyrics describing what Madonna is prepared to do for her lover, and that she is individualistic and shameless.

The next track "I Know It" has a gentler swing to it and features music from piano, a saxophone, synth phrases while having an offbeat chord change. "Holiday" consists of a four-bar sequence, featuring instrumentation from guitars, electronic drums and handclaps from the Oberheim DMX, cowbell played by Madonna and a synthesized string arrangement. A side-by-side repetitive progression is achieved by making use of the chorus. Towards the end of the song, a change in the arrangement happens, where a piano break is heard. Lyrically, the song expresses the universal sentiment that everybody needs a holiday. In "Think of Me", Madonna warns her erring lover that he should pay her attention or else she would leave. The song consists of beats from the Linn drum machine and a saxophone interlude. "Physical Attraction" is a medium paced track, with synth bass, a guitar line, sounds of a brass and Madonna singing in a shrill voice, about the attraction between herself and a boy. The last song on the album is "Everybody", which starts with a heavily synthesized and spoken introduction, with Madonna taking a loud intake of breath. She displayed her bubblegum-pop like voice in the song, which was also doubletracked.

Release and artwork 

The album was first released in the United States by Sire Records on July 27, 1983. It was originally slated to be titled Lucky Star, after the track of the same name. The original album cover was shot by photographer Edo Bertoglio and the sleeve designed by Madonna's friend Martin Burgoyne, but according to Seymour Stein, Madonna felt "it just wasn't iconic enough." The album was eventually titled simply Madonna, perhaps that this singular name could have star power. The album cover was shot by photographer Gary Heery and directed by Carin Goldberg. The front cover shows Madonna with short-cropped platinum hair, wearing a number of black rubber bangles on her hands and a dog chain around her throat. Her navel is also prominent on the inner sleeve of the album. Madonna commented: "The picture inside the dust of sleeve of my first album has me, like, in this Betty Boop pose with my belly button showing. Then when people reviews the album, they kept talking about my cute belly button. [...] I think there are other unobvious places on the body that are sexy and the stomach is kind of innocent." Regarding the album photoshoot, Gary Heery recalled:
[Madonna] arrived at my Broadway studio in New York with a small bag of clothes and jewelry, and no entourage. Then, in front of the camera she was explosive, like a great model, but with her own unique style. She came over the next day to see some prints and the proofs, and there was shot after shot to choose from. We agreed on every choice and whittled it down to the album cover images. I had no idea what I had just been a party to.
The album was re-released in 1985 for the European market and re-packaged as Madonna: The First Album with a different artwork created by photographer George Holy. The cover features Madonna in similar style of dress to the original cover but this time with crucifix as her earrings. Madonna's trademark style was catching on as a fashion statement among club kids and fans, with her crucifix accessories becoming the jewelry of the moment. Madonna said that wearing a crucifix is "kind of offbeat and interesting. I mean, everything I do is sort of tongue-in-cheeks. Besides, the crucifixes seem to go with my name." In 2001, Warner Bros. Records released a remastered version of the album with its original artwork and two bonus remix tracks of "Burning Up" and "Lucky Star". Madonna dedicated the album to her father, Tony Ciccone, with whom her relationship had not been good until the release of the album. In an interview with Time magazine, Madonna said: "My father had never believed that what I was doing here [in New York] was worthwhile, nor did he believe that I was up to any good. [...] It wasn't until my first album came out and my father started hearing my songs on the radio that he stopped asking the questions."

Promotion 

Madonna had promoted the album throughout 1983–84 by performing a series of "track dates", one-off gigs. These shows were done at New York City and London clubs like Danceteria and Camden Palace and on American and British television programs like Dancin' on Air, American Bandstand, and Top of the Pops. On American Bandstand, Madonna performed the track "Holiday" and told interviewer Dick Clark that she wanted "to rule the world." John Mitchell from MTV said that the appearance "remains one of her most legendary." The album's singles were later performed on The Virgin Tour in 1985. It was Madonna's first concert tour and visited North American dates. The Virgin Tour received mixed reception from critics, but was a commercial success. As soon as the tour was announced, tickets were sold out everywhere. Macy's New York department store was flooded with buyers, who bought the tour merchandise like the crucifix earrings and fingerless gloves. After its end, the Virgin Tour was reported to have grossed over $5 million ($ million in  dollars), with Billboard Boxscore reporting a gross of $3.3 million ($ million in  dollars). The tour was recorded and released in VHS, as Madonna Live: The Virgin Tour. Later authors have looked back at the tour and commented that it was clear that "[Madonna] was a bonafide pop star in the process of becoming a cultural icon." Shari Benstock and Suzanne Ferriss noted the clothes and fashion in the tour and said, "Virgin Tour established Madonna as the hottest figure in pop music."

Singles 

Madonna released five singles from the album, although two of those singles actually preceded the album's release by several months. "Everybody" was released on October 6, 1982, as Madonna's debut single; at this point, the rest of the Madonna album had not yet been recorded or even conceived of. Musically incorporating R&B infused beats, "Everybody" portrayed the image of Madonna as a black artist, since her picture did not appear on the single cover. However this misconception was cleared later when Madonna convinced Sire executives to allow her to shoot a music video for the song. The low-budget music video directed by Ed Steinberg portrayed Madonna and her friends singing and dancing in a club to the song. The video helped to promote the song and Madonna as an artist further. "Everybody" failed to enter the Billboard Hot 100 chart and only charted at number 107 on the Bubbling Under Hot 100 on January 22, 1983. Nevertheless, the single was a hit on the Billboard Hot Dance/Club Play Chart, peaking at number three.

"Burning Up" was released as the second single in the US on March 9, 1983, and later issued in some countries as a double A-side single with "Physical Attraction". The single peaked at number three on the dance chart in the US, and became Madonna's first top twenty hit in Australia. The accompanying music video of the song portrays Madonna writhing passionately on an empty road before her "lover" approaches in a car from behind. The video ends with Madonna driving the car instead, suggesting that she is ultimately in control. 

"Holiday" was released as the third single on September 7, 1983, and became Madonna's first top-ten hit in many countries, including Australia, Belgium, Germany, Ireland, the Netherlands and the UK. It also became her first entry ever on the Billboard Hot 100, reaching number 16, and her first number-one hit on the dance chart.

Originally released in the UK on September 9, 1983, "Lucky Star" was the fourth single from the album. The single peaked at number four on the Billboard Hot 100. The music video portrayed Madonna dancing in front of a white background, accompanied by her dancers. After the video was released, Madonna's style and mannerisms became a fashion trend among the younger generation. Scholars noted that in the video, Madonna portrayed herself as narcissistic and an ambiguous character. She referred to herself as the "lucky star", unlike the lyrical meaning of the song. 

"Borderline" was the fifth single from the album, and was released on February 15, 1984. In the US, the song was released before "Lucky Star" and became Madonna's first top-ten hit on the Billboard Hot 100, peaking at ten. Elsewhere, the song reached the top twenty of a number of European nations while peaking the chart in Ireland. The accompanying music video portrayed Madonna, with a Latin man as boyfriend. She was enticed by a British photographer to pose and model for him, but later returned to her original boyfriend. The video generated interest amongst academics, who noted the use of power as symbolism in it.

Video compilation 
A video compilation, titled Madonna, was released by Warner Music Video and Sire Records in November 1984 to promote the album. The singer's first video compilation, it contained three music videos from the album—"Burning Up", "Borderline" and "Lucky Star"—as well as the then current single "Like a Virgin". The music video for "Lucky Star" was a special extended dance mix, and when she says "ooh yeah" it is echoed three times and her image is repeated three times. "Like a Virgin" omits the scene where the lion's tongue moves in time with the beat of the music. These videos were later released on the 1990 greatest hits compilation The Immaculate Collection with these edits changed. The video was promoted at the Cabaret Metro club in Chicago, on February 9, 1985. Dubbed as 'The Virgin Party', the event drew a crowd of around 1,200 and promoted Madonna's LPs, cassettes, CDs and the videocassette. Attendees were encouraged to wear white, and for $5 admission fees, were able to view the Madonna videocassette and the premiere of the music video of her then upcoming single "Material Girl". The event was organised as a drive to promote music videos, which at that point did not have a large market.

Madonna topped the Music Videocassette chart of Billboard for the period from April 13, 1985, to November 9, 1985. Jim McCullaugh from Billboard attributed the strong sales of the video to Madonna's recent studio album Like a Virgin and The Virgin Tour concert. It placed at number one on the year-end music videocassette chart for 1985. Madonna was certified platinum by the Recording Industry Association of America (RIAA) for shipments of 100,000 units of the video. It won the award for the "Best Selling Video Cassette Merchandised as Music Video" from the National Association of Recording Merchandisers.

Critical reception 

Madonna received generally positive reviews. Stephen Thomas Erlewine from AllMusic wrote that the album "cleverly incorporated great pop songs with stylish, state-of-the-art beats, and it shrewdly walked a line between being a rush of sound and a showcase for a dynamic lead singer. This is music where all of the elements may not particularly impressive on their own — the arrangement, synth, and drum programming are fairly rudimentary — but taken together, it's utterly irresistible." Tony Power from Blender said that the album consisted of "quacking synths, overperky bass and state-of-the-art mechanical disco, with Madonna strapped to the wing rather than holding the controls. It's a breathless, subtlety-free debut, with overtones of Soft Cell and Tom Tom Club." Reviewing the remastered version of the album, released in 2001, Michael Paoletta from Billboard stated that "Nearly 20 years after the release of Madonna, such tracks as 'Holiday', 'Physical Attraction', 'Borderline' and 'Lucky Star' remain irresistible." Jim Farber from Entertainment Weekly said that "[Madonna] might have wound up just another post-disco dolly if [the songs on the album] didn't announce her ability to fuse club beats with peerless pop." In July 2008, the magazine ranked the album at number five in their list of "Top 100 Best Albums of Past 25 Years".

Bill Lamb from About.com commented: "[The] album is state of the art dance-pop loaded with hits from 'Holiday' and 'Lucky Star' to 'Borderline'. Irresistible pop hooks glide across shimmering synth beats to make this a landmark album of the early 80's." Jonathan Ross from Q said that "'Borderline' is sweet and 'Holiday' still fizzes with invention and joie de vivre....this quintessentially '80s dance hit also features a barrelhouse piano solo." Robert Christgau wrote in The Village Voice, "In case you bought the con, disco never died – just reverted to the crazies who thought it was worth living for. This shamelessly ersatz blonde is one of them, and with the craftily orchestrated help of a fine selection of producers, remixers, and DJs, she's come up with a shamelessly ersatz sound that's tighter than her tummy – essence of electro, the D in DOR." Don Shewey from Rolling Stone was of the opinion that "without overstepping the modest ambitions of minimal funk, Madonna issues an irresistible invitation to the dance." Sal Cinquemani from Slant Magazine commented: "Heralding the synth-heavy movement was a debut album [Madonna] that sounds just as fresh today as it did almost two decades ago." In March 2012, the publication placed the album at number 33 on their "Best Albums of the 1980s" list. Michaelangelo Matos from Spin selected the album among "The Definitive Guide to Classic Disco" and noted that it "mashed-up street sounds and reinvigorated disco for a generation that wanted nothing to do with polyester suits, ending an era and birthing a new one."

Commercial performance 

In the United States, the album entered the Billboard 200 albums chart at number 190, the week of September 3, 1983. The album had a slow and steady climb, and peaked at eight on the Billboard 200 on the week ending October 20, 1984, more than a year after its release. It also peaked at twenty on the Top R&B/Hip-Hop Albums. Within a year, Madonna had sold 2.8 million copies in the United States. It placed at number twenty-seven on the year-end chart for 1984 and at number 25 on the year-end chart for 1985, with Madonna becoming the top pop artist for the year 1985. After 17 years since its release, the album was certified five-times Platinum by the RIAA for shipment of five million copies across United States. With the advent of the Nielsen SoundScan era in 1991, the album sold a further 450,000 copies as of August 2010.

In Canada, the album was released on March 10, 1984, and debuted at number 87 on the RPM Albums Chart. After few weeks it re-entered the chart again, at number 95 on August 4, 1984. The album finally reached its peak position of number 16 in its 29th week. It was present on the chart for a total of 47 weeks, and ranked at number 50 on the RPM Top 100 Albums of 1984 list.

In the United Kingdom, the album was released on February 11, 1984, and charted on the UK Albums Chart, reaching a peak of thirty-seven and present on the chart for twenty weeks. After a re-release titled Madonna – The First Album in July 1985, the album charted again on the UK Albums chart. It ultimately reached a peak of number six and was present on the chart for 125 weeks. Six months since the re-release, the album was certified Platinum by the British Phonographic Industry (BPI) for shipment of 300,000 copies of the album. In Australia, the album reached a peak of ten on the Kent Music Report albums chart and was certified triple platinum. The album reached the top ten of the charts in Netherlands, France and New Zealand; in the last two markets, it was certified Platinum. It was also certified Platinum in Hong Kong and Gold in Germany and Spain. In November 2019, the album managed to enter the Spanish Albums Charts for the first time, since it failed to do it at the time of the release. Worldwide the album has sold more than 10 million copies.

Legacy 

Stephen Thomas Erlewine said that with the album, Madonna began her career as a disco diva, in an era that did not have any such divas to speak of. In the beginning of the 80s, disco was an anathema to the mainstream pop and, according to him, Madonna had a huge role in popularizing dance music as mainstream music, using her charisma, chutzpah and sex appeal. Erlewine claimed that Madonna "launched dance-pop" and set the standard for the genre for the next two decades. The staff of Vice magazine stated that the album "drew the blueprint for future dance-pop." Rolling Stone ranked the album at number 50 on "The 100 Best Albums of the Eighties" list, writing that "[the album's] assured style and sound, as well as Madonna's savvy approach to videos, helped the singer make the leap from dance diva to pop phenom, and it pointed the direction for a host of female vocalists from Janet Jackson to Debbie Gibson." In 2013 and 2022, they ranked it as the 96th and 16th best debut album of all time, respectively, saying "it succeed in introducing the most important female voice in the history of modern music".

According to biographer Andrew Morton, the album made Madonna a household name, and was instrumental in introducing her star power. Martin Charles Strong, author of The Great Rock Discography felt that the album's unprecedented dance-pop and naive appeal served Madonna in establishing her base as an artist. Kyle Anderson from Entertainment Weekly commented: "Madonna's sound, and of course her look, would be heavily copied for years to come, but Madonna heralded something much bigger: the arrival of the pop diva as a singular force who put personality above all else." According to author Santiago Fouz-Hernández, the songs on Madonna reveal several key trends that have continued to define her success, including a strong dance-based idiom, catchy hooks, highly polished arrangement and Madonna's own vocal style. In songs such as "Lucky Star" and "Burning Up", Madonna introduced a style of upbeat dance music that would prove particularly appealing to future gay audiences.

Music critics Bob Batchelor and Scott Stoddart, commented in their book The 1980s that "the music videos for the singles off the album, was more effective in introducing Madonna to the rest of the world." Author Carol Clerk said that the music videos of "Burning Up", "Borderline" and "Lucky Star" established Madonna, not as the girl-next-door, but as a sassy and smart, tough funny woman. Her clothes worn in the videos were later used by designers like Karl Lagerfeld and Christian Lacroix, in Paris Fashion week of the same year. Professor Douglas Kellner, in his book Media Culture: Cultural Studies, Identity, and Politics Between the Modern and the Postmodern, commented that the videos depicted motifs and strategies which helped Madonna in her journey to become a star. With the "Borderline" music video, Madonna was credited for breaking the taboo of interracial relationships, and it was considered one of her career-making moments. MTV played the video in heavy rotation, increasing Madonna's popularity further.

Following the release of the album, Madonna was dismissed by some critics. They called her voice sounding as "Minnie Mouse on helium", while the other detractors suggested that she was "almost entirely helium, a gas-filled, lighter-than-air creation of MTV and other sinister media packagers." Madonna said: "From the very beginning of my career, people have been writing shit about me and saying, 'She's a one-hit wonder, she'll disappear after a year'." She responded to the comment "Minnie Mouse on helium" by doing a photoshoot with Alberto Tolot, where she flirted with a giant Mickey Mouse toy, putting its hand inside her dress and looking at it with an admonishing glare. Author Debbi Voller noted that "such provocative imagery at a young age of her career, could have hurt her too much. But it went on to shut those twerps who dared to take a swag at her voice again." Twenty-five years later, in her acceptance speech of Rock and Roll Hall of Fame induction, Madonna thanked the critics who snubbed her in the early years, "The ones that said I was talentless, that I was chubby, that I couldn't sing, that I was a one-hit wonder. They pushed me to be better, and I am grateful for their resistance."

Track listing 

Notes
  signifies a remix by John "Jellybean" Benitez
 "Burning Up" (alternate album version) – 4:48 appeared on early pressings of the album and was used for the vinyl edition of Madonna: The First Album, released in Europe in 1985.
 "Everybody" – 6:02 replaces the original album version, which fades a minute earlier, with its full length version on pressings 2001 onwards.

Formats 
Vinyl, Cassette, CD – includes the 8-track album
Vinyl (1985) – Reissued in Europe with new artwork and renamed as Madonna: The First Album. This format uses the alternate album version of "Burning Up". Also released as a limited edition with fold-out poster of the cover minus typography.
CD (2001 & 2020) – Remastered 10-track edition includes all tracks from the original album and two bonus remixes of "Burning Up" and "Lucky Star". This version includes full length version of "Everybody" – 6:02. This version replaced the 1985 international re-release and reverted the album back to its original artwork and title in those territories.
Digital download (2005) – Same tracks as the 2001 remastered version, except erroneously uses the "Holiday" remix version from The Immaculate Collection.

Personnel 
Adapted from the album's liner notes.

 Madonna – lead vocals, background vocals, cowbell (5)
 Dean Gant – synthesizers, acoustic piano, electric piano
 Ed Walsh – synthesizers
 Fred Zarr – synthesizers, electric piano, acoustic piano (5), Fender Rhodes (5), Oberheim OB-X (5), Moog bass (5), drums (5), co-arrangements (5)
 Paul Pesco – guitars (1, 3)
 Reggie Lucas – guitars, LinnDrum programming
 Ira Siegel – guitars
 Curtis Hudson – guitars (5), arrangements (5)
 Anthony Jackson – electric bass (2)
 Raymond Hudson – bass (5)
 Leslie Ming – LinnDrum programming
 Bashiri Johnson – percussion (5)
 Bob Malach – tenor saxophone
 Chrissy Faith – background vocals
 Gwen Guthrie – background vocals
 Brenda White – background vocals
 Norma Jean Wright – background vocals
 Tina B. – background vocals (5)

Production 
 Reggie Lucas – producer (1–4, 6, 7)
 John "Jellybean" Benitez – producer (5), remixing (1, 3, 7)
 Mark Kamins – producer (8)
 Jim Dougherty – sound engineer (1–4, 6, 7)
 Jay Mark – remix engineer (1, 3, 7), mixing engineer (5)
 Michael Hutchinson – sound engineer (5)
 Butch Jones – sound engineer (8)
 Ted Jensen – audio mastering at Sterling Sound (New York City)
 Freddy DeMann – management
 Ron Weisner – management

Design 
 Carin Goldberg – art direction
 Gary Heery – photography
 George Holy – photography (Madonna – The First Album)

Record company 
 Sire Records – record label, U.S. copyright owner 
 Warner Bros. Records – U.S. marketing and distributor  record label, copyright owner 
 WEA International – international distributor, international copyright owner

Charts

Weekly charts

Year-end charts

Certifications and sales

See also 
 List of best-selling albums by women

Notes

References

Bibliography

External links 
 
 

1983 debut albums
Madonna albums
Sire Records albums
Warner Records albums
Albums recorded at Sigma Sound Studios
Post-disco albums